James Richard Skidmore (8 February 1916 – 22 August 1998) was an English jazz tenor saxophonist. He was born in Manor Park, London and was the father of tenor and soprano saxophonist Alan Skidmore.

Perhaps best known for his work with George Shearing from 1950 to 1952, Jimmy Skidmore worked with a variety of other well-known jazz musicians, including Humphrey Lyttelton, Victor Feldman and Kenny Baker.

After celebrating his 80th birthday by playing alongside his son, Skidmore died in Welwyn Garden City, Hertfordshire, England, in August 1998, at the age of 82.

Select discography
Oh Monah w/ Nat Gonella (Philips)
Kenny Baker and Jazz Today Unit (Polygon)
Kenny Baker and Friends (Nixa)
The Melody Maker's All-Stars (Nixa)

With Humphrey Lyttelton
Humph Plays Standards (Bethlehem)
Humphrey Lyttelton and His Band (London)
Music in the Making (Vogue)
Jazz Today Unit (Esquire)
Jazz Showcase (Nixa)

References

1916 births
1998 deaths
English jazz tenor saxophonists
British male saxophonists
People from Manor Park, London
20th-century English musicians
20th-century saxophonists
20th-century British male musicians
British male jazz musicians